Usilai Mani (உசிலை மணி) was an Indian film actor. He worked predominantly in Tamil movie industry. He has acted over 1000 films and stage plays. His popular movies include Enga ooru Kavalkaran and Ayul Kaithi. His dialogue பேஷ்... பேஷ்... ரொம்ப நன்னாயிருக்கு! for Narasu's Coffee were famous in the 1980s and 1990s.

Early life 
His birth name is Subramaniyan Iyer. He was born in Usilampatti,Madurai, Thirunelveli to parents Krishnan Iyer–Subbulakshmi. Usilmani became famous as Usili, shortening the name of his town.

Film career 
In addition to Tamil, he has acted in Telugu, Malayalam and Hindi films. He acted as a comedian through four generations, starting from MGR and Sivaji to heroes like Kamal Haasan, Rajinikanth and Vijayakanth, Mohan.

Death 
In 1993 he suffered diabetes. His legs were removed, leading him to stop acting. On 14.5.1996 he died at age 62. He had a wife, a son and a daughter.

Filmography

1960s

1970s

1980s

1990s

References 

1934 births
1996 deaths
Tamil actors